Milton Costa de Castro (born 19 April 1954) is a Brazilian sprinter. He competed in the men's 100 metres at the 1980 Summer Olympics.

References

1954 births
Living people
Athletes (track and field) at the 1980 Summer Olympics
Brazilian male sprinters
Olympic athletes of Brazil
Athletes from Rio de Janeiro (city)
Pan American Games medalists in athletics (track and field)
Pan American Games bronze medalists for Brazil
Athletes (track and field) at the 1979 Pan American Games
Medalists at the 1979 Pan American Games
20th-century Brazilian people
21st-century Brazilian people